Tembe Elephant Park is a 30 012 ha game reserve in Maputaland, KwaZulu-Natal, South Africa. It is adjacent to Ndumo Game Reserve.

The park was developed by Tembe Tribal Authority and Ezemvelo KZN Wildlife.

It was established in 1983 to protect elephants which used to migrate between Maputaland and southern Mozambique. These elephants were traumatised by poaching during the civil war in Mozambique so the park was only opened to the public in 1991. The park is now home to 250 elephants which are the largest in the world. Isilo, the largest living tusker in the southern hemisphere, died in 2014.

200 more elephants which used to be part of the same group live in the Maputo Elephant Reserve in Mozambique. The Lubombo Transfrontier Conservation Area is planned to link the two reserves and the Lubombo Conservancy in Eswatini in a single transfrontier reserve.

More than 340 bird species have been recorded in Tembe, including the rare Rudd's apalis, the rufous-bellied heron, the Natal nightjar and the Woodwards's batis.

This park is to be included into the Usuthu-Tembe-Futi Transfrontier Conservation Area.

References

External links
 Tembe Elephant Park
 Ezemvelo KZN Wildlife
 Tembe Wilderness Trust
 Tembe Live WebCam

Ezemvelo KZN Wildlife Parks